Philip O'Sullivan Beare (1590–1660) was an Irish soldier who became more famous as a writer. He fled to Habsburg Spain during the time of Tyrone's Rebellion, when Gaelic Ireland was making its last stand against Tudor England. He subsequently authored the book, the Catholic History of Ireland, which offered a history from the perspective of the native Irish Catholics.

Biography
Philip O'Sullivan Beare was born in Dursey, the son of Dermot O'Sullivan and nephew of Donal O'Sullivan Beare, Prince of Beare. The O'Sullivans, headed by the O'Sullivan Beare, owned much of Valentia Island in south-western Ireland.

He was sent to Spain in 1602, and was educated at Compostela by Vendamma, a Spaniard, and John Synnott, an Irish Jesuit.

He served in the Spanish army. In 1621 he published his Catholic History of Ireland, a work not always reliable, but valuable for the Irish wars of the author's own day. He also wrote a Life of St. Patrick, a confutation of Gerald of Wales and a reply to James Usher's attack on his History.

He died in 1660 in Spain, leaving a "daughter of twelve years to inherit his titles in Ireland and his goods".

Works
 O'Sullivan Beare, Philip, Historiae Catholicae Iberniae. Spain. 1621. Edited by Matthew Kelly 1850, Dublin: Printed by John O'Daly. Portion translated into English by Matthew J. Byrne 1903, titled Ireland under Elizabeth, and also Chapters towards a History of Ireland in the reign of Elizabeth. Dublin: Sealy, Bryers & Walker.
 O'Sullivan Beare, Philip,  Zoilomastix. Spain. 1625. Translated into English by Denis O'Sullivan 2009, titled The Natural History of Ireland. Cork: Cork University Press.

See also
 Ruaidhrí Ó Flaithbheartaigh
 Anthony Bruodin
 John Colgan
 Conor O'Mahony (priest)

Further reading

References

1590 births
1660 deaths
17th-century Irish people
People from County Cork
Irish writers
17th-century Irish historians
Wild Geese (soldiers)
Irish expatriates in Spain
Irish soldiers in the Spanish Army
People of Elizabethan Ireland
Irish chiefs of the name